Robert Di Rosa (born 4 July 1977) is a former Australian rules footballer who played for Geelong in the Australian Football League (AFL) in 1995. He was recruited from the Western Jets in the TAC Cup with the 18th selection in the 1994 AFL Draft.

References

External links

Living people
1977 births
Geelong Football Club players
Western Jets players
Australian rules footballers from Victoria (Australia)